Nedenes District Court was a district court in Aust-Agder county, Norway. The court was based in the town of Arendal. The court existed from 1852 until 2004. It had jurisdiction over the municipalities of Arendal, Froland and Åmli. Cases from this court could be appealed to Agder Court of Appeal.

The court was a court of first instance. Its judicial duties were mainly to settle criminal cases and to resolve civil litigation as well as bankruptcy. The administration and registration tasks of the court included death registration, issuing certain certificates, performing duties of a notary public, and officiating civil wedding ceremonies. Cases from this court were heard by a combination of professional judges and lay judges.

History
This court was established on 23 March 1852 when the old district courts for the region were reorganized. The Åmli area of the old Østre Råbyggelaget District Court plus the Øyestad area of the Vestre Nedenes District Court plus the Austre Moland area from the Østre Nedenes District Court were merged to form the new Nedenes District Court. In 1935, the town of Arendal was added to the jurisdiction of this court when the old Arendal District Court was closed. On 1 September 2004, the Nedenes District Court was merged with the old Holt District Court and Sand District Court to create the new Aust-Agder District Court.

References

Defunct district courts of Norway
Organisations based in Arendal
1852 establishments in Norway
Courts and tribunals disestablished in 2004
2004 disestablishments in Norway